Yevgeni Anatolyevich Glukhov (born 22 June 1974) is a Russian football official and a former player.

References

1974 births
Living people
Soviet footballers
FC Elektrometalurh-NZF Nikopol players
Russian footballers
FC Sirius Kryvyi Rih players
Russian expatriate footballers
Expatriate footballers in Ukraine
FC Chernomorets Novorossiysk players
Russian Premier League players
FC Dynamo Stavropol players
FC Kuban Krasnodar players
FC Zhetysu players
Expatriate footballers in Kazakhstan
FC Armavir players
FC Slavyansk Slavyansk-na-Kubani players
Association football forwards